Henry Pelham (February 14, 1748/49 – 1806) was an American painter, engraver, and cartographer active during the late 18th century. Pelham's many illuminating letters, especially to his half-brother John Singleton Copley, provide an important contemporary perspective of the events of the American Revolution.

Pelham was born in Boston, Massachusetts, where his father, Peter Pelham, a limner, engraver, and schoolmaster, had married Mary (Singleton) Copley, widow of Richard Copley and mother of John Singleton Copley. His father died in 1751. A small tobacco shop run by his mother provided support for the family until Copley brought prosperity to them all through his portrait painting. Their home was on Lindall Street, at the present-day intersection of Exchange Place and Congress Street. From there Henry attended the Boston Latin School. He is assumed to have studied drawing and painting with his half-brother. It was a likeness of Henry Pelham, then aged fifteen or sixteen, that featured in A Boy with a Flying Squirrel, a painting that was exhibited in London in 1766 and brought Copley his first fame abroad.

Pelham is perhaps best known for creating a 1770 engraving titled The Fruits of Arbitrary Power, or The Bloody Massacre, which depicted the Boston Massacre of March 5, 1770. He lent a copy to Paul Revere, who copied it and produced his own engraving. Because Revere's version was advertised for sale three weeks after the Massacre and a week before Pelham's version went on sale, and because it failed to credit him, Pelham felt that Revere had taken advantage of him.

A much more ardent Loyalist than Copley, Pelham expressed himself vigorously against his Patriot neighbors, whom he held to be misguided and rebellious. In the winter of 1775, while making a journey on horseback to Philadelphia, a mob attacked him in Springfield, Massachusetts, as one of "a damn'd pack of Torys." His sketch of the redoubts on Bunker Hill is reproduced with the Copley-Pelham letters. His Plan of Boston was engraved in aquatint in London in 1777.

Pelham left Boston with other Loyalists in August 1776. Arriving in London, where the Copleys were settled, he supported himself by teaching drawing, perspective, geography, and astronomy. In 1777, he contributed to the Royal Academy The Finding of Moses, which was engraved by W. Ward in 1787. The following year he exhibited some enamels and miniatures. Having married Catherine Butler, daughter of William Butler of Castle Crine, County Clare, Ireland, Pelham subsequently went to Ireland. His wife, however, died while bearing twin sons, Peter and William, and Pelham returned with them to London. He and Copley shared in the estate of their mother, who died in Boston on April 29, 1789. Soon after this Pelham was named agent for Lord Lansdowne's Irish estates, a work which he followed with energy and ability. He became a civil engineer and cartographer, and his county and baronial maps are important documents of Irish history. Pelham drowned from a boat in 1806 while superintending the erection of a martello tower in the River Kenmare.

Notes

References

"Henry Pelham." Dictionary of American Biography. American Council of Learned Societies, 1928–1936.

External links

John Singleton Copley in America, a full text exhibition catalog from The Metropolitan Museum of Art, which contains material on Henry Pelham (see index)

Year of birth unknown
1740s births
1806 deaths
American engravers
American cartographers
Portrait miniaturists
People from colonial Boston
18th century in Boston
18th-century American painters
18th-century American male artists
American male painters
Artists from Boston
Painters from Massachusetts
American Loyalists from Massachusetts
Deaths by drowning
Accidental deaths in Ireland